Komsomolskoye is a rural locality (a settlement) in Pervomayskoye Rural Settlement, Ertilsky District, Voronezh Oblast, Russia. The population was 169 as of 2010. There are 5 streets.

Geography 
Komsomolskoye is located 35 km south of Ertil (the district's administrative centre) by road. Pervomaysky is the nearest rural locality.

References 

Rural localities in Ertilsky District